Deh-e Mohsen may refer to:

Deh-e Mohsen, Lorestan, a village in Lorestan Province, Iran
Deh-e Mohsen, Sistan and Baluchestan, a village in Sistan and Baluchestan Province, Iran